Fernbus Simulator is a bus simulator game developed by TML-Studios and published by Aerosoft for Microsoft Windows. The game is powered by Unreal Engine 4 and was available on 25 August 2016 worldwide.

Gameplay

Fernbus Simulator is set in Germany, offering a route network of approximately 20,000 kilometres and 40 German cities that is built in a scale of 1:10.
More city routes were released as DLCs, expanding the map to the following countries: Austria, Switzerland, France, Luxembourg, Netherlands, Belgium and Czech Republic.
The game features quite the same gameplay of the similar-genre video game Euro Truck Simulator 2, which includes construction sites, traffic congestion, police patrols and traffic collision, with dynamic weather and day-night cycle are available in the game. The game also provides the licensed MAN Lion's Coach of Flixbus, allowing players to drive on highly detailed German motorways.

Development and release
Fernbus Simulator is developed by a German-based game studio TML-Studios, the developers of the City Bus Simulator series and the World of Subways franchise. It is powered by Unreal Engine 4 of Epic Games. The game was released on 25 August 2016 for Microsoft Windows.

Reception
The game is well-sold on the digital distribution platform Steam, but often comes in criticism and gets a mixed rating. The game is often used to compare with Euro Truck Simulator 2 and American Truck Simulator, and gets praised on the design of the game in terms of atmosphere, motorways, residential areas and detailed bus cockpit. However, bugs, missing textures, insufficient to reality and a lack of long-term motivation makes the game widely criticised.

References

External links 

  

2016 video games
Bus simulation video games
Open-world video games
Single-player video games
TML-Studios games
Unreal Engine games
Video games developed in Germany
Video games set in Germany
Video games set in Austria
Video games set in Switzerland
Video games set in France
Video games set in the Netherlands
Video games set in Belgium
Video games set in the Czech Republic
Video games set in Luxembourg
Windows games
Windows-only games